Buvlja pijaca (trans. Flea Market) is the fourth studio album from Serbian and former Yugoslav rock band Riblja Čorba, released in 1982.

The album is the second Riblja Čorba album produced by John McCoy. It featured a softer sound than previous Riblja Čorba releases, as some of the songs featured string and brass instruments and had elements of acoustic rock.

The album was polled in 1998 as the 64th on the list of 100 greatest Yugoslav rock and pop albums in the book YU 100: najbolji albumi jugoslovenske rok i pop muzike (YU 100: The Best albums of Yugoslav pop and rock music).

Album cover
The album cover was designed by Jugoslav Vlahović, and is the only Riblja Čorba album cover which does not feature Riblja Čorba logo.

Track listing

Personnel
Bora Đorđević - vocals
Rajko Kojić - guitar
Momčilo Bajagić - guitar
Miša Aleksić - bass guitar
Miroslav Milatović - drums

Additional personnel
Kornelije Kovač - keyboard
Rešad Jahja - cello
Petar Jovanović - cello
Miroljub Aranđelović - clarinet
Miroslav Blažević - trumpet
Asan Selimović - tuba
Miomir Maksimčev - viola
Petar Mladenović - viola
Geza Balaž - violin
Gordana Todorović - violin
Miloš Lazarević - violin
Miroljub Milošević - violin
Stojan Grbić - violin
Žarko Mićković - violin
John McCoy - producer
Tony Taverner - recorded by
Jovan Stojanović - engineer

Reception and legacy
The album brought a number of hit songs: ironical love songs "Draga ne budi peder", "U dva će čistači odneti đubre", "Dobro jutro", and political and satirical songs "Slušaj sine, obriši sline", "Kako je lepo biti glup" (inspired by Đorđević's service in Yugoslav People's Army), "Pravila, pravila", "Kad ti se na glavu sruši čitav svet" and "Ja ratujem sam". It was sold in more than 250,000 copies, which was less than expected, considering the number of previous albums' copies sold.

The songs "U dva će čistači odneti đubre", "Kad ti se na glavu sruši čitav svet", "Ja ratujem sam", "Pravila, pravila", "Kako je lepo biti glup" and "Dobro jutro" appeared in Mića Milošević's 1982 movie A Tight Spot.

In 1998, Buvlja pijaca was polled the 64th on the list of 100 greatest Yugoslav rock and pop albums in the book YU 100: najbolji albumi jugoslovenske rok i pop muzike (YU 100: The Best albums of Yugoslav pop and rock music).

In 2015 Buvlja pijaca album cover was ranked 57th on the list of 100 Greatest Album Covers of Yugoslav Rock published by web magazine Balkanrock.

References 

Buvlja pijaca at Discogs
 EX YU ROCK enciklopedija 1960-2006,  Janjatović Petar;  
 Riblja čorba,  Jakovljević Mirko;

External links 
Buvlja pijaca at Discogs

Riblja Čorba albums
1982 albums
PGP-RTB albums